Holmedal is a village in Askvoll Municipality in Vestland county, Norway. The village was a part of Fjaler municipality before 1990 when it was administratively transferred to Askvoll municipality. The village has some industries, such as knife factory, Helle Fabrikker. Holmedal Church is also located here.

References

Villages in Vestland
Askvoll